CMTA may refer to:

Capital Metropolitan Transportation Authority, a public transit provider owned by the city of Austin, Texas.
California Municipal Treasurers Association, a professional organization of California county, city, and special district public treasurers. 
Central Maryland Transportation Alliance, a coalition of Baltimore area business, civic and nonprofit leaders intent on improving travel efficiency within Central Maryland. 
Charcot-Marie-Tooth Association, which supports the development of new drugs to treat Charcot–Marie–Tooth disease.
Christian Music Trade Association, an organization associated with the Christian music industry that focuses on traditional Gospel music, Southern Gospel music, and Contemporary Christian music.
Certified Metabolic Typing Advisor, a professional certification for a diet-related holistic health care sub-speciality.
Canadian Marine Transportation Administration, Canadian government entity, responsible for marine transportation

Engineering Firm based out of Louisville Kentucky.